Kirill Pavlov (born 13 September 1986 in Alma-Ata, Kazakh SSR, Soviet Union) is Kazakhstani weightlifter competing in the 77 kg category. He competed at the 2012 Summer Olympics, finishing 9th. He won the silver medal at the 2010 Asian Games.

He originally finished fourth in the clean and jerk and total at the 2014 World Weightlifting Championships, but gold medalist Daniel Godelli was disqualified after he tested positive for stanozolol use, giving Pavlov two bronze medal performances.

He is notable in weightlifting for his unorthodox clean technique, with a very pronounced hitch at the hips and diving under the bar.

Major results

References 

Kazakhstani male weightlifters
1986 births
Living people
World Weightlifting Championships medalists
Weightlifters at the 2012 Summer Olympics
Olympic weightlifters of Kazakhstan
Kazakhstani people of Russian descent
Asian Games medalists in weightlifting
Weightlifters at the 2010 Asian Games
Asian Games silver medalists for Kazakhstan
Medalists at the 2010 Asian Games
20th-century Kazakhstani people
21st-century Kazakhstani people